Hank Williams, You Wrote My Life is the fourth album by country singer Moe Bandy, recorded in 1975 and 1976 and released in 1976 on the Columbia label recorded at Columbia Recording Studio "B", Nashville, Tennessee.

Track listing
 "Hank Williams, You Wrote My Life" (Paul Craft) - 3:10
 "I'm The Honky Tonk On Loser's Avenue" (Sanger D. Shafer) - 2:25
 "Ring Around Rosie's Finger" (C. Smith/C. Manser) - 1:46
 "The Lady's Got Pride" (Sanger D. Shafer) - 2:05
 "You've Got A Lovin' Comin'" (R. Bowling) - 2:54
 "The Biggest Airport In The World" (Sanger D. Shafer) - 2:21
 "Hello Mary" (B. Bond) - 1:47
 "The Hard Times" (E. Penney/T. Benjamin/H. Moffatt) - 2:51
 "I Think I've Got A Love On For You" (Dallas Frazier/L. Lee) - 2:24
 "I'm Not As Strong As I Used To Be" (K. P. Powell/D. Orender) - 2:33

Musicians
 Bob Moore
 Lloyd Green (Courtesy of Monument Records)
 Ray Edenton
 Hargus "Pig" Robbins
 Bobby Thompson
 Kenny Malone
 Johnny Gimble
 Dave Kirby
 Charlie McCoy (Courtesy of Monument Records)
 Leo Jackson
 Weldon Myrick
 Jimmy Capps

Backing
 The Jordanaires

Production
 Sound Engineers - Lou Bradley & Ron Reynolds
 Photography - Jim McGuire
 Design - Bill Barnes

1976 albums
Moe Bandy albums
Columbia Records albums
Albums produced by Ray Baker (music producer)